In chemistry, concentration is the abundance of a constituent divided by the total volume of a mixture. Several types of mathematical description can be distinguished: mass concentration, molar concentration, number concentration, and volume concentration. The concentration can refer to any kind of chemical mixture, but most frequently refers to solutes and solvents in solutions. The molar (amount) concentration has variants, such as normal concentration and osmotic concentration.

Etymology
The term concentration comes from the word concentrate, from the French , from con– + center, meaning “to put at the center”.

Qualitative description

Often in informal, non-technical language, concentration is described in a qualitative way, through the use of adjectives such as "dilute" for solutions of relatively low concentration and "concentrated" for solutions of relatively high concentration. To concentrate a solution, one must add more solute (for example, alcohol), or reduce the amount of solvent (for example, water). By contrast, to dilute a solution, one must add more solvent, or reduce the amount of solute. Unless two substances are miscible, there exists a concentration at which no further solute will dissolve in a solution. At this point, the solution is said to be saturated. If additional solute is added to a saturated solution, it will not dissolve, except in certain circumstances, when supersaturation may occur. Instead, phase separation will occur, leading to coexisting phases, either completely separated or mixed as a suspension. The point of saturation depends on many variables, such as ambient temperature and the precise chemical nature of the solvent and solute.

Concentrations are often called levels, reflecting the mental schema of levels on the vertical axis of a graph, which can be high or low (for example, "high serum levels of bilirubin" are concentrations of bilirubin in the blood serum that are greater than normal).

Quantitative notation

There are four quantities that describe concentration:

Mass concentration

The mass concentration  is defined as the mass of a constituent  divided by the volume of the mixture :

The SI unit is kg/m3 (equal to g/L).

Molar concentration

The molar concentration  is defined as the amount of a constituent  (in moles) divided by the volume of the mixture :

The SI unit is mol/m3. However, more commonly the unit mol/L (= mol/dm3) is used.

Number concentration

The number concentration  is defined as the number of entities of a constituent  in a mixture divided by the volume of the mixture :

The SI unit is 1/m3.

Volume concentration

The volume concentration  (not to be confused with volume fraction) is defined as the volume of a constituent  divided by the volume of the mixture :

Being dimensionless, it is expressed as a number, e.g., 0.18 or 18%; its unit is 1.

There seems to be no standard notation in the English literature.
The letter  used here is normative in German literature (see Volumenkonzentration).

Related quantities

Several other quantities can be used to describe the composition of a mixture. Note that these should not be called concentrations.

Normality

Normality is defined as the molar concentration  divided by an equivalence factor . Since the definition of the equivalence factor depends on context (which reaction is being studied), the International Union of Pure and Applied Chemistry and National Institute of Standards and Technology discourage the use of normality.

Molality

Not to be confused with molarity.

The molality of a solution  is defined as the amount of a constituent  (in moles) divided by the mass of the solvent  (not the mass of the solution):

The SI unit for molality is mol/kg.

Mole fraction

The mole fraction  is defined as the amount of a constituent  (in moles) divided by the total amount of all constituents in a mixture :

The SI unit is mol/mol. However, the deprecated parts-per notation is often used to describe small mole fractions.

Mole ratio

The mole ratio  is defined as the amount of a constituent  divided by the total amount of all other constituents in a mixture:

The SI unit is mol/mol. However, the deprecated parts-per notation is often used to describe small mole ratios.

Mass fraction

The mass fraction  is the fraction of one substance with mass  to the mass of the total mixture , defined as:

The SI unit is kg/kg. However, the deprecated parts-per notation is often used to describe small mass fractions.

Mass ratio

The mass ratio  is defined as the mass of a constituent  divided by the total mass of all other constituents in a mixture:

The SI unit is kg/kg. However, the deprecated parts-per notation is often used to describe small mass ratios.

Dependence on volume and temperature
Concentration depends on the variation of the volume of the solution with temperature, due mainly to thermal expansion.

Table of concentrations and related quantities

See also

References

Analytical chemistry
Chemical properties